Magic, Ritual, and Witchcraft is a peer-reviewed academic journal that focuses on magic scholarship. It is published triannually (spring, summer, winter) by the University of Pennsylvania Press. The founding editors were Michael Bailey (Iowa State University) and Brian Copenhaver (UCLA). , the editors-in-chief are Claire Fanger (Rice University) and Michael Ostling (Arizona State University). The journal is available online through Project MUSE.

The publication is affiliated with Societas Magica, an organization of scholars interested in magic.

See also
Aries: Journal for the Study of Western Esotericism
The Pomegranate: The International Journal of Pagan Studies

References

External links

 Magic, Ritual, and Witchcraft at Project MUSE
Societas Magica

Publications established in 2006
Western esotericism studies journals
Western esotericism
Religious studies
Biannual journals
University of Pennsylvania Press academic journals
English-language journals